A special election was held in  on July 23, 1827 to fill a vacancy caused by the resignation of Daniel Webster (A) on May 30, 1827 after being elected to the Senate.

Election results

Gorham took his seat on December 3, 1827.

See also
List of special elections to the United States House of Representatives

References

Massachusetts 1827 01
Massachusetts 1827 01
1827 01
Massachusetts 01
United States House of Representatives 01
United States House of Representatives 1827 01